Fragile X mental retardation syndrome-related protein 2 is a protein that in humans is encoded by the FXR2 gene.

Function 

The protein encoded by this gene is an RNA binding protein containing two KH domains and one RCG box, which is similar to FMRP and FXR1. It associates with polyribosomes, predominantly with 60S large ribosomal subunits. This encoded protein may self-associate or interact with FMRP and FXR1. It may have a role in the development of fragile X mental retardation syndrome.

Interactions 

FXR2 has been shown to interact with:

 CYFIP2,
 FMR1, 
 FXR1,  and
  LCMT1.

References

Further reading